Gage County is a county in the U.S. state of Nebraska. As of the 2020 United States Census, the population was 21,704. Its county seat is Beatrice. The county was created in 1855 and organized in 1857. It was formed from land taken from the Otoe in an 1854 treaty. The county was named for William D. Gage, a Methodist minister who served as the first chaplain of the Nebraska Territorial Legislature.

Gage County comprises the Beatrice, NE Micropolitan Statistical Area, which is also in the Lincoln-Beatrice, NE Combined Statistical Area.

In the Nebraska license plate system, Gage County is represented by the prefix 3 (it had the third-largest number of vehicles registered in the county when the license plate system was established in 1922).

Geography
Gage County lies on the south line of Nebraska. Its south boundary line abuts the north boundary line of the state of Kansas. The Big Blue River runs SSE through the central part of the county.

Major highways

  U.S. Highway 77
  U.S. Highway 136
  Nebraska Highway 4
  Nebraska Highway 8
  Nebraska Highway 41
  Nebraska Highway 43
  Nebraska Highway 103
  Nebraska Highway 112

Adjacent counties

 Lancaster County - north
 Otoe County - northeast
 Johnson County - northeast
 Pawnee County - east
 Marshall County, Kansas - southeast
 Washington County, Kansas - southwest
 Jefferson County - west
 Saline County - northwest

Protected areas
 Homestead National Monument
 Rockford Lake State Recreation Area

Demographics

As of the 2000 United States Census, there were 22,993 people, 9,316 households, and 6,204 families in the county. The population density was 27 people per square mile (10/km2). There were 10,030 housing units at an average density of 12 per square mile (5/km2).  The racial makeup of the county was 97.69% White, 0.32% Black or African American, 0.58% Native American, 0.28% Asian, 0.03% Pacific Islander, 0.26% from other races, and 0.84% from two or more races. 0.85% of the population were Hispanic or Latino of any race. 56.6% were of German, 6.9% Irish, 6.3% English and 6.3% American ancestry.

There were 9,316 households, out of which 30.30% had children under the age of 18 living with them, 56.70% were married couples living together, 7.10% had a female householder with no husband present, and 33.40% were non-families. 29.20% of all households were made up of individuals, and 15.00% had someone living alone who was 65 years of age or older. The average household size was 2.36 and the average family size was 2.91.

The county population contained 24.00% under the age of 18, 7.70% from 18 to 24, 26.30% from 25 to 44, 22.80% from 45 to 64, and 19.20% who were 65 years of age or older. The median age was 40 years. For every 100 females there were 94.10 males. For every 100 females age 18 and over, there were 91.40 males.

The median income for a household in the county was $34,908, and the median income for a family was $43,072. Males had a median income of $29,680 versus $21,305 for females. The per capita income for the county was $17,190. About 6.60% of families and 8.70% of the population were below the poverty line, including 9.70% of those under age 18 and 8.00% of those age 65 or over.

Communities

Cities
 Beatrice (county seat)
 Blue Springs
 Wymore

Villages

 Adams
 Barneston
 Clatonia
 Cortland
 Filley
 Liberty
 Odell
 Pickrell
 Virginia

Census-designated place
 Holmesville

Unincorporated communities

 Ellis
 Hoag
 Krider
 Lanham
 Rockford

Townships

 Adams
 Barneston
 Blakely
 Blue Springs-Wymore
 Clatonia
 Elm
 Filley
 Glenwood
 Grant
 Hanover
 Highland
 Holt
 Hooker
 Island Grove
 Liberty
 Lincoln
 Logan
 Midland
 Nemaha
 Paddock
 Riverside
 Rockford
 Sherman
 Sicily

Politics
Prior to 1940, Gage County was a swing county, backing the national winner in every presidential election from 1900 to 1936. Since then, it has become a Republican stronghold, aside from the 1964 election in which Democrat Lyndon B. Johnson won the county in the midst of his national landslide victory.

See also
 National Register of Historic Places listings in Gage County, Nebraska
 Oto Reservation

References

External links

 

 
1857 establishments in Nebraska Territory
Populated places established in 1857